Sheryl Lynn Lee (born April 22, 1967) is a German-born American film, stage, and television actress. After studying acting in college, Lee relocated to Seattle, Washington to work in theater, where she was cast by David Lynch as Laura Palmer and Maddy Ferguson on the 1990 television series Twin Peaks and in the 1992 film Twin Peaks: Fire Walk with Me. After completing Twin Peaks, she returned to theater, appearing in the title role of Salome on Broadway opposite Al Pacino.

Her film roles include Astrid Kirchherr in Backbeat (1994), as well as a lead role in the drama Mother Night (1996), the role of Katrina in John Carpenter's Vampires (1998) and the part of April in Winter's Bone (2010). She has had recurring roles on such television series as One Tree Hill (2005–06) and Dirty Sexy Money (2007–2009), and later reprised her role of Laura Palmer in the Showtime revival of Twin Peaks in 2017.

Early life
Lee was born in Augsburg, Bavaria, West Germany to an artist mother and architect father; the first of three children. She grew up in Boulder, Colorado, United States, where she was a graduate of Fairview High School (class of 1985). After graduating, Lee moved to Pasadena, California where she studied at the American Academy of Dramatic Arts, and later attended the North Carolina School of the Arts, the National Theatre Conservatory in Denver, and the University of Colorado.

After several years of studying, Lee moved to Seattle, Washington where she acted in several stage plays and appeared in several commercials. She studied with theater director Mark Jenkins at the now-defunct Empty Space Theater in Seattle.

Career

1986—1993: Career beginnings and Twin Peaks

Lee's first television role was as the dead Laura Palmer in the television series Twin Peaks. To save on money, creator David Lynch intended to cast a local girl from Seattle "just to play a dead girl". That local girl ended up being Sheryl Lee. Lynch asked her to audition for him after seeing a publicity photo of her in Seattle from one of the plays she was starring in at the time. "But no one — not Mark, me, anyone — had any idea that she could act, or that she was going to be so powerful just being dead." The image of Lee wrapped in plastic as well as her homecoming queen photograph became one of the show's most enduring and memorable images. When Lynch shot the home movie that James Hurley takes of Donna Hayward and Laura, he realized that Lee had something special. "She did do another scene — the video with Donna on the picnic — and it was that scene that did it." As a result, Sheryl Lee became a semi-regular addition to the cast, appearing in flashbacks as Laura, and becoming a recurring character, Laura's cousin Maddy Ferguson, later in the series (a role which was reportedly written because Lynch, impressed with her abilities, wanted to give her a fuller role on the show). She worked again with Lynch when she appeared as Glinda the Good Witch in Wild at Heart (1990).

She also starred in the prequel Twin Peaks: Fire Walk with Me, which elaborated on events leading up to Laura Palmer's death. While the film itself was a critical and financial failure at the time of its release, Lee was praised by the critics for her performance, which earned her Best Actress nominations at the Independent Spirit Awards and the Saturn Awards. For her work in Twin Peaks, Lee has been described as a "Scream queen", in particular for scenes in the otherworldly Black Lodge.

In 1992 Lee starred as Salome alongside Al Pacino in the Broadway production of Oscar Wilde's Salome in the Circle in the Square Theatre under the direction of Robert Allan Ackerman. The play co-starred Suzanne Bertish, Esai Morales and Arnold Vosloo.

1994—2004: Backbeat and Post-Peaks career
In 1994 she was cast as Astrid Kirchherr in the film Backbeat, a bio-pic of the early career of The Beatles opposite Stephen Dorff. The following years, Lee played the part of Liza in Gary Walkow's 1995 adaptation of Fyodor Dostoyevsky's novella Notes from Underground opposite Henry Czerny, the role of Helga and Resi Noth in the 1996 romantic war film Mother Night, based on Kurt Vonnegut's 1961 novel of the same name, starred alongside Craig Sheffer in Bliss (1997) and played the role of Katrina in John Carpenter's 1998 film Vampires opposite James Woods and Daniel Baldwin. She played also a leading role in the 1999 crime drama film Angel's Dance with Kyle Chandler and Jim Belushi and starred as Dr. Sarah Church in the short lived series L.A. Doctors (1998—1999) which ran for a single season.

Lee starred opposite Anthony Michael Hall as the sweet but vengeful housewife Eve Robbins in the 2001 USA Cable movie Hitched.

In 2001 she presented the I Love 1990 segment of the BBC's popular I Love 1990s series.

There is speculation that she (and Phoebe Augustine, who played her friend Ronette in Twin Peaks) appeared in David Lynch's Mulholland Drive (2001). Many online databases even list them as appearing uncredited in the movie, but it's unknown if it's actually them or actresses who look similar to Laura and Ronette, and it has never been confirmed either way.

She played the leading role of Elinore Murphy in Children on Their Birthdays (2002), based on the short story of the same title by Truman Capote. In the 2003 television series Kingpin, she played the role of Marlene Cadena opposite Yancey Arias and Bobby Cannavale.

In 2004 Lee was the original choice for the role of Mary-Alice Young on Desperate Housewives. It would have been the second time she would have played a dead character on a series; however, the producers ultimately chose to replace her with Brenda Strong, as producers thought that Lee was not right for the part. Strong commented on the casting change for her character, explaining, "I think it was a conceptual shift ... There certainly wasn't something wrong with what [Lee] did. It was just that instead of vanilla they wanted chocolate, and I happened to be chocolate."

2005—present: Return to television and Independent films

In 2005–06, she played the recurring role of Ellie Harp, the biological mother of Peyton Sawyer (played by Hilarie Burton), who battles breast cancer, on the third season of the WB Network series One Tree Hill.
In 2007 and 2008 Lee appeared on the ABC dramedy Dirty Sexy Money as Andrea Smithson, the mother of Brian Darling's (Glenn Fitzgerald) illegitimate child. Lee, along with several other Twin Peaks cast members, guest starred in a special Twin Peaks-themed episode of Psych titled "Dual Spires." Other cast members reunited with Lee included Sherilyn Fenn (Audrey Horne), Dana Ashbrook (Bobby Briggs), Ray Wise (Leland Palmer), Lenny Von Dohlen (Harold Smith), Robyn Lively (Lana Budding Milford), and Catherine E. Coulson (The Log Lady).

In 2010 she appeared in a supporting role as April in Debra Granik's Winter's Bone (which won best picture at the Sundance Film Festival in 2010). The film is about a seventeen-year-old girl (Jennifer Lawrence) in the rural Ozarks, caring for her mentally-ill mother and her younger brother and sister, when she discovers that her father put their house and land up as a bond for a court appearance, at which he failed to appear. Lee won two Awards for Best Ensemble at Detroit Film Critics Society and Gotham Awards, shared with the cast. Lee played Lucie Sliger in the 2011 crime thriller Texas Killing Fields alongside Jessica Chastain, Sam Worthington and Chloë Grace Moretz.

In the art drama thriller White Bird in a Blizzard (2014), written and directed by Gregg Araki, she played May opposite Shailene Woodley and Eva Green. In 2015, at the Twin Peaks UK Festival, Lee confirmed that she would be returning to Twin Peaks for the 2017 limited Showtime run.

In 2016 she appeared in a supporting role as Air in the Netflix production Rebirth, which premiered at the Tribeca Film Festival, and had a small part as Karen in Café Society, written and directed by Woody Allen. The film had its premiere at the 2016 Cannes Film Festival. In 2017 she reprised her role as Laura Palmer in Twin Peaks and also playing the part of Carrie Page, making it her third character in the series. Although she was credited in every one of the 18 episodes, most of her appearance was in archive footage. New material of her was seen in the episodes Part 2, Part 17 and Part 18. The same year, she starred as Alley in the short film Dead Ink Archive by David Schendel, making it their second collaboration after the 1994 film The Can (which was filmed in the late 1980s). In 2018 Lee played one of the leads in the Teen-Thriller #SquadGoals as Emily Hodges.

In 2019, Lee returned to Theater, playing alongside Judd Nelson in Love Letters. She performed the play before in 1991 with Luke Perry and Tim Daly as co-stars.

The 2020 released book Laura's Ghost: Women Speak about Twin Peaks by Courtenay Stallings, which explores the legacy of the fictional character Laura Palmer, played by Lee in the television show Twin Peaks, features interviews and a foreword from Lee.

Personal life

Lee dated David Duchovny, who was one of her Twin Peaks cast-mates. She was at one time married to Jesse Diamond, a photographer and son of singer and songwriter Neil Diamond. They have a son, Elijah, born in 2000.

In 2014, Lee revealed that she had been diagnosed with a rare blood disorder called neutropenia.

Lee is also a Teacher at UCLA School of Theater, Film and Television. Together with her former Twin Peaks castmate Gary Hershberger (who played Mike Nelson), Lee teaches actors, directors and writers at their workshop "The Actor's Director Workshop".

Philanthropy and activism
Lee is an animal rights and environmental activist. She appeared nude in two print advertisements for PETA.

In October 2008, Lee participated in the 3rd Munchkin's Project Pink annual breast cancer awareness campaign to raise money for breast cancer research.

Additionally, Lee has also participated in various environmentalist events and charities: In November 2000, she attended the premiere of the public awareness campaign Why Are We Here?, to raise awareness for biodiversity protection, In 2011, Lee attended the iMatter March in Denver, Colorado to raise awareness about climate change, and also supported the  Ride for Renewables project to promote renewable energy. In December 2011, Lee advocated the protection of wolves and supported the environmental organization WildEarth Guardians' "Wolves in the American West" campaign.

In September 2012, Lee signed environmental activist Tom Weis' open letter calling on President Barack Obama and Governor Mitt Romney to withdraw their support for the construction of the southern leg of Keystone XL, a pipeline that would transport bitumen from Montana to Texas. Other signatories included climate scientist James Hansen and actors Daryl Hannah, Mariel Hemingway, and Ed Begley, Jr.

On December 8, 2012, Lee performed poems written by herself as part of a collaborative performance along with artist Marina DeBris, dancer Maya Gabay, and musician Marla Leigh, for the U.S. National Committee for UN Women's First Annual Special Assembly: Women, Climate Change, and Human Rights.

Filmography

Film

Television and web

Video games

Music videos

Stage credits

Audiobook

Awards and recognition

References

Further reading

 "Woman of the Year: Laura Palmer".  Esquire.  Volume 114.  Issue 2.  August 1990.  p. 118–119.
 "Twin Peaks' Sheryl Lee Goes from Dead Role to Dead Ringer", by Laurie Grassi.  TV Guide (Canada).  Volume 14: Issue 45.  November 10, 1990.
 "Sheryl's Peril", by James Wolcott.  Vanity Fair.  February 1992.  p. 106–107.
 "Sur la Croisette: Arrêts sur Images sur Quarante-Cinq Acteurs",  by Michel Rebichon.  Studio (France).  Issue 62: Spécial Cannes 1992.  May 1992.  p. 138.
 "5 July 1992 Sheryl Lee Interview", by Robert Getz.  Wrapped In Plastic.  Issue 16.  April 1995.
 "Sheryl Lee",  by Silvia Bizio.  Max (Italy).  September 1992.  p. 128–133.
 "Laura Palmer Lives!", by Jeff Dawson.  Empire.  December 1992.  p. 54–55.
 "A New Peak for Sheryl Lee", by Graham Fuller.  Interview.  March 1994.
 "Sheryl Lee Interview", by Craig Miller & John Thorne.  Wrapped In Plastic.  Issue 16.  April 1995.  p. 5–10.
 "The Bliss of Being Sheryl Lee", by Edward Guthman.  San Francisco Chronicle.  June 8, 1997.
 "There's No Killing Laura Palmer: The Unstoppable Twin Peaks Ingenues", by Troy Patterson.  Entertainment Weekly.  February 13, 1998.
 "Three Women, One Peek: Sheryl Lee, Sherilyn Fenn and Lara Flynn Boyle Finally Leave David Lynch's World. Almost",  by Ted Allen.  Esquire.  October 1998.
 "Sheryl Lee on Vampires", by John Thonen.  Femme Fatales.  Volume 7: Issue 6.  November 1998.  p. 16–17.
 "Sheryl Lee Takes a Swipe at Animal Acts".  PETA's Animal Times. Summer 1999.
 CNT-News-cover_15.article "Welcome to the TP Time Warp. Where Are They Now? Fire Walk with the Cast of Twin Peaks",  by Paige Wiser.  Chicago Sun-Times.  April 15, 2007.

External links

 
 
 Sheryl Lee at the American Film Institute catalog
 

Living people
Actresses from Boulder, Colorado
American film actresses
American stage actresses
American television actresses
Expatriate actresses in Germany
University of Colorado Boulder alumni
21st-century American women
1967 births